National Science Library is a state owned and supported science library of Bangladesh.

History
National Science Library was established in 1981 under the Bangladesh National Scientific and Technical Documentation Centre. Its functions are to collected scientific publications and books.

References

Government agencies of Bangladesh
1981 establishments in Bangladesh
Organisations based in Dhaka
Libraries in Bangladesh
Science libraries
Science and technology in Bangladesh
Libraries established in 1981